Deborah Davis is the first hazzan (also called cantor) of either sex (and therefore, since she is female, the first female hazzan) in Humanistic Judaism. She was ordained in 2001. She is the lead singer of (and a founder of) the Second Avenue Klezmer Ensemble, which she also named.

References

Hazzans
American Jews
Women hazzans
Living people
Year of birth missing (living people)